Zohra Lampert is an American actress, who has had roles on stage, film and television. She performed under her then-married name of Zohra Alton early in her career.

Among her performances were as the title character in the 1971 cult horror film Let's Scare Jessica to Death. She also starred alongside Natalie Wood and Warren Beatty in the 1961 film Splendor in the Grass.

Lampert achieved critical acclaim for her work on Broadway as well, earning two Tony Award nominations for her roles in Look: We've Come Through (1962) and Mother Courage and Her Children (1963). She won a Primetime Emmy Award for Outstanding Guest Actress in a Drama Series for her role in a 1975 episode of Kojak.

Early life and education
Lampert was born in New York City, the only child  of Rose and Morris Lampert, both Russian-Jewish immigrants. In 1940 the family lived in the Washington Heights section of Manhattan. and Morris Lampert worked in a hardware store.  She attended the University of Chicago, graduating in 1952. She also studied acting at HB Studio.

Career 
Lampert joined other University of Chicago alumni, including Ed Asner and Anthony Holland, in Playwrights Theater Club, which was established in Chicago by the theatrical producer David Shepherd. She later said that until she was thrust on stage as Grisha in Berthold Brecht's Caucasian Chalk Circle, in which she had initially joined the cast as assistant scenic designer, she thought "I might want to become something scholarly. A librarian, not an actor." She subsequently appeared as The Actress in Rounddance, drawing praise from Sydney J. Harris of the Chicago Daily News as "unquestionably the find of the summer season. . . a gypsy-like girl with elfin grace and the dramatic constitution of Shirley Booth."

She left the Playwrights Theater Club to study acting with Mira Rostova, Montgomery Clift's acting coach, even though her upbringing had taught her that acting "was an unserious thing to do."  After a stint as a member of the Second City troupe in Chicago, she appeared on Broadway as Zohra Alton in the 1956 Broadway production of Diary of a Scoundrel.

Lampert, who began performing under her birth name after her divorce from Alton, gave a Tony-nominated performance in 1961's Look: We've Come Through.. In 1964 she became one of the 26 members of the newly established Lincoln Center Repertory Theater company.

She scored with a pair of small, noteworthy performances in the films Pay or Die and Splendor in the Grass. In the 1960s/1970s, she was active in supporting roles in film and television, and won an Emmy for her performance as a gypsy in an episode of Kojak ("Queen of the Gypsies", 1975). She co-starred with Gena Rowlands in John Cassavetes' Opening Night (1977).

She was a regular in the sitcom The Girl with Something Extra and the medical drama Doctors' Hospital. During the early 1970s, she originated the role of Ellie Jardin on the CBS soap Where the Heart Is until her character was killed off in 1972. In 1986, she appeared in an episode of Knight Rider (season 4, "Hills of Fire"). She worked less during the 1980s and 1990s. She appeared in The Exorcist III (playing actor George C. Scott's wife) and the offbeat 1999 film The Eden Myth.

Later years
After a ten-year absence from films, Lampert returned to acting in supporting roles in two films: The Hungry Ghosts (2009) and Zenith (2010).

Personal life 
Lambert married radio personality Jonathan Schwartz in 2010. She was previously married to Bill Alton, a founding member of Second City and fellow Playwrights Theater Club actor.

Filmography

Film

Television

Accolades

Notes

References

External links

American film actresses
American stage actresses
American television actresses
Emmy Award winners
Jewish American actresses
Living people
Actresses from New York City
University of Chicago alumni
American people of Russian-Jewish descent
20th-century American actresses
21st-century American actresses
The High School of Music & Art alumni
21st-century American Jews
Year of birth missing (living people)